Steve McNamara (born 18 September 1971) is an English professional rugby league football coach who is the head coach of the Catalans Dragons in the Betfred Super League and a former professional player. He is a former coach of England, and a Great Britain international as a player.

At club level he played for Hull F.C., Bradford Bulls, Wakefield Trinity Wildcats and the Huddersfield Giants. He came through the coaching ranks at the Bradford Bulls, rising to the Head coach position in the Super League. He held assistant coaches positions at the Sydney Roosters and the New Zealand Warriors in the NRL.

Early years
McNamara was born in Kingston upon Hull, East Riding of Yorkshire, England. He attended South Holderness Technology College in Preston, Hull.

Playing career

Hull
McNamara joined Hull F.C. from local amateur side Skirlaugh at the age of 17 and he was selected to go on the 1992 Great Britain Lions tour of Australia and New Zealand. McNamara won caps for Great Britain while at Hull F.C. in 1992 against France (sub), in 1993 against France (sub), won caps for England while at Hull F.C. in 1995 against Wales (sub), and France. He'd spent seven years with Hull FC, before moving to the Bradford Bulls in 1996.

Bradford Bulls
While at the Bradford Bulls in 1996 he also played for England against France. He played for Great Britain while at Bradford Bulls in 1997 against Australia (SL) (2 matches) (sub). In 1999 he represented England against France (2 matches). At the Bradford Bulls he was the main goal-kicker and kicked 349 goals.

Wakefield Trinity Wildcats
McNamara was released from the Bradford Bulls in 2000 and joined Wakefield Trinity Wildcats (captain). In 2000, at the height of a financial crisis at Wakefield Trinity Wildcats, the contracts of all players aged over 24 were terminated during September 2000. The players affected were; Andy Fisher, Bobbie Goulding, Warren Jowitt, Tony Kemp (player-coach), Steve McNamara, Francis Maloney, Martin Masella, Steve Prescott, Bright Sodje, Francis Stephenson and Glen Tomlinson.

McNamara joined the Huddersfield Giants before joining the coaching staff at Bradford Bulls at the end of the 2003's Super League VIII.

Coaching career
He coached the Bradford Bulls' Senior Academy to Grand Final success in his first year as a coach at the club.

On 20 April 2006 Steve was promoted to head coach of Bradford Bulls following Brian Noble's departure to Wigan Warriors. At the time he was the youngest coach in Britain.

In his first season in charge, he guided the Bradford Bulls to the Super League playoffs before the club were knocked out of the grand final eliminator by Hull FC.

McNamara was appointed Great Britain assistant coach on 30 April 2007.

His coaching career while at the Bradford Bulls contains several unwanted records, such as being the first Bradford Bulls coach in Super League to fail to guide his team to the end of season play-offs and being in charge for the worst losing streak the club has seen in 20 years.

Bradford Bulls fans became increasingly frustrated with his team's lacklustre performances since taking over the reins in 2006 and following defeat by Harlequins RL (the 8th defeat in a row, the Bradford Bulls worst run in Super League history). His time as Bradford Bulls head coach came to an end on 13 July 2010 as the Bradford Bulls board ended his contract by mutual consent and allowed him to become full-time England coach.

As of April 2010 he was part-time England coach until the end of the 2010 Super League season. He became full-time England coach afterwards. He won his first game as England coach against France 60–6. This game was played at the Leigh Sporting Village on Saturday 12 June 2010.

He coached England to the 2013 Rugby League World Cup semi-final.

On 12 December 2013, McNamara was appointed the assistant coach of the 2013 National Rugby League (NRL) premiers the Sydney Roosters. The Sydney Roosters head coach Trent Robinson was looking for a new assistant coach because his previous assistant Paul Green took up the head coaching position of the North Queensland Cowboys.

He joined the New Zealand Warriors for the 2017 season.

He coached Catalans to the 2018 Challenge Cup Final victory over the Warrington Wolves at Wembley Stadium.

In the 2021 Super League season, McNamara guided Catalans to their first ever League Leaders Shield and first ever Grand Final.  McNamara was also named Super League's coach of the year.  On 9 October 2021, McNamara coached Catalans in their 2021 Super League Grand Final defeat against St. Helens.

International coaching record

Overall record

As of 14 November 2015

References

External links
(archived by web.archive.org) England battle to French wins
2001 Super League Team-by-team guide

1971 births
Living people
Bradford Bulls coaches
Bradford Bulls players
Catalans Dragons coaches
England national rugby league team coaches
England national rugby league team players
English rugby league coaches
English rugby league players
Great Britain national rugby league team players
Huddersfield Giants players
Hull F.C. players
New Zealand Warriors coaches
Rugby league locks
Rugby league players from Kingston upon Hull
Rugby league props
Wakefield Trinity players